Army 2020, was the name given to the restructuring of the British Army, in light of the 2010 Strategic Defence and Security Review.

Background
The British Government gave an indication of its proposals for the future structure of the Army in early 2008, in a press report stating that it was considering restructuring the Army into a force of three deployable divisional headquarters and eight 'homogenous or identical' brigades, each with a spread of heavy, medium and light capabilities. This report indicated that the existing 16 Air Assault Brigade would be retained as a high-readiness rapid reaction force.

Subsequently, it was reported that the former Chief of the General Staff, General Sir Richard Dannatt, wanted to see the Army structured so as to extend the interval between operational tours from two to two-and-a-half years.

In 2010, the Strategic Defence and Security Review was published. As part of the plans, the British Army will be reduced by 23 regular units, and by 2020 will number 117,000 soldiers, of whom 82,000 would be regulars and 30,000 will be reservists. The Strategic Defence and Security Review 2015 increased the planned number of reservists from 30,000 to 35,000.

Structure prior to Army 2020
The structure of the army prior to the reforms, was as follows:

Originally envisaged structure

The originally envisaged future structure was announced on 19 July 2011 in a briefing paper entitled Defence Basing Review: Headline Decisions. This structure had five identical multi-role brigades, each of around 6,500 personnel. However, in June 2012 a significantly different structure known as "Army 2020" was announced.

The divisional headquarters of 2nd, 4th and 5th Divisions were disbanded in 2012 and replaced by a single formation known as Support Command, based at Aldershot.

The five multi-role brigades envisaged in 2011 would have comprised:
 One armoured regiment of Challenger 2 tanks
 One armoured reconnaissance regiment
 One armoured infantry battalion in Warrior armoured fighting vehicles
 One mechanised infantry battalion in FV432 "Bulldog" armoured vehicles
 Two light role infantry battalions

Combat Support and Logistics would have been retained at divisional level. It was envisaged that 19th Light Brigade then part of 3rd Mechanised Division, would be disbanded.

Structure

The Reaction Force

The 16 Air Assault Brigade, comprising two battalions of the Parachute Regiment and two Army Air Corps regiments of attack helicopters. This will deliver a very high readiness Lead Air Assault Task Force, with the rest of the brigade ready to move at longer notice.

The 3rd (UK) Mechanised Division, renamed the 3rd (United Kingdom) Division, comprising three armoured infantry brigades: 1st Armoured Infantry Brigade, 12th Armoured Infantry Brigade and 20th Armoured Infantry Brigade. These three brigades will rotate, with one being the lead brigade, a second undergoing training and the third involved in other tasks. The lead brigade will deliver a Lead Battlegroup at very high readiness, with the rest of the brigade at longer notice.

The complete air assault brigade and a full mechanised brigade will be available for deployment within three months. All three brigade's HQs are to be based in the Salisbury Plain Training Area.

The Adaptable Force
The 1st Armoured Division, renamed as the 1st (United Kingdom) Division, along with Support Command. Comprises seven infantry brigades (4th, 7th, 11th, 38th, 42nd, 51st and 160th) of various sizes, each made up of paired regular and Territorial Army forces, drawn from an Adaptable Force pool of units. These infantry brigades will be suited to domestic operations or overseas commitments (such as the Falkland Islands, Brunei and Cyprus) or, with sufficient notice, as a brigade level contribution to enduring stabilisation operations.

Force Troops Command

The boxes above provides the general structure of the British Army once Army 2020 is completed. It excludes units under Regional Command, Recruiting and Training Command, or units under other commands such as the air defence regiments.

The term "Regional Point of Command," encompassing organisations such as Headquarters North East, also appears to have been introduced under the Army 2020 series of reorganisations.

Changes to units

Royal Armoured Corps
Four of the Royal Armoured Corps' Regiments will merged into two regiments:
 9th/12th Royal Lancers and Queen's Royal Lancers will merge to become The Royal Lancers
 1st Royal Tank Regiment and 2nd Royal Tank Regiment will merge to form the Royal Tank Regiment.

Royal Artillery

39 Regiment Royal Artillery disbanded, with its Multiple Launch Rocket Systems being transferred to the rest of the Royal Artillery and Territorial Army.

In accordance with the Strategic Defence and Security Review, the number of AS-90 self-propelled guns was reduced by 35%. The number of active Challenger 2 tanks was cut by around forty per cent, and by 2014 had been reduced to 227.

12th and 16th Royal Artillery would continue to  be placed under a joint Army-RAF unit: Joint Ground-Based Air Defence Command.

Infantry
Four of the British Army's 36 regular infantry battalions were disbanded or merged with sister units in their regiments:
 2nd Battalion, Royal Regiment of Fusiliers (light role)
 3rd Battalion, Yorkshire Regiment (Green Howards) (light role)
 2nd Battalion, Royal Welsh (Royal Regiment of Wales) (armoured infantry)
 3rd Battalion, Mercian Regiment (Staffords) (armoured infantry)

A fifth battalion, the Argyll and Sutherland Highlanders, 5th Battalion Royal Regiment of Scotland, was reduced to a single company to carry out public duties in Scotland.

However, through the 2020 reforms, 3 new battalions of infantry (1 regular, 2 reserve) were created including:
 3rd Battalion, Royal Gurkha Rifles (specialist infantry)
 4th Battalion, Princess of Wales's Royal Regiment (Army Reserve)
 8th Battalion, The Rifles (Army Reserve)

Joint Helicopter Command/Army Air Corps
The Joint Helicopter Command remained an integral part of the land force. The Army Air Corps was reduced by one regular regiment. 1 and 9 Regt AAC merged, operating the new Wildcat helicopter. One Regiment will be at high readiness annually, with one Apache Squadron committed towards the Lead Armoured Battlegroup. 653 AAC to be an Operational Training Squadron from 2015, leaving the Apache Regiments with four active squadrons altogether. The government pledged to upgrade 50 AgustaWestland Apache to AH-64E standard, however, an 11 May 2017 US government contract list states that only 38 will be re-manufactured.

Army Reserve
The Territorial Army was renamed the Army Reserve, and expanded from 19,000 to 30,000 personnel. Its military equipment was to be upgraded to meet the standards of the regular army and its units will realigned. The 2015 review increased the intended strength of the Reserves to 35,000.

Corps of Royal Electrical and Mechanical Engineers
The regular component of the REME structure was reduced by one battalion to seven regular battalions.

Royal Military Police
As part of the drawdown from Germany, the Royal Military Police lost one regiment: 4 Regiment RMP, with all provost companies re-subordinating. The three remaining regiments were re-organised.

Other
British Forces Royal Logistic Corps in Germany will be withdrawn back to the UK by 2015:
 8 Regiment RLC disbanded (formerly at BFG Munster and late York Barracks) on 31 March 2012.
 24 Regiment RLC (part of 104th Logistic Support Brigade) will disband in Bielefeld, Germany in August 2013.
 23 Pioneer Regiment RLC (part of 104th Logistic Support Brigade) at Bicester disbands in 2013/14.

Basing
An initial basing plan located infantry brigades throughout the United Kingdom, with the three reaction force brigades situated in the Salisbury Plain Training Area. On 5 March 2013, a future basing plan of units in the UK was released. As noted above, all Germany-based units will be relocated to the UK, with the Salisbury Plain area holding the largest concentration of troops.

References

External links
 Army 2020 Brochure
 Army 2020 July 2013 update
 Regular British Army basing plan March 2013
 Major British Army sites
 Structure of regular British Army as given by AFF
 Army Reserve changes and future basing

 
Programmes of the Government of the United Kingdom
2012 in British politics
21st-century military history of the United Kingdom